Hamilton Boyle, 6th Earl of Cork and 6th Earl of Orrery (3 February 1729 – 17 January 1764) was the son of John Boyle, 5th Earl of Cork and Lady Henrietta Hamilton. He inherited the titles of 6th Earl of Cork and Orrery and 3rd Baron Boyle of Marston from his father in 1762.

He served in the Parliament of Great Britain as member of parliament (MP) for Warwick between 1751 and 1762, and represented Charleville in the Irish House of Commons between 1759 and 1760. He was unmarried and was succeeded by his brother.

References

External links
Boyle family

1729 births
1764 deaths
British MPs 1761–1768
Irish MPs 1727–1760
Dungarvan, Hamilton Boyle, Viscount
Members of the Parliament of Ireland (pre-1801) for County Cork constituencies
Hamilton

6th
6th
3rd